Mula sa Puso is a 1997 Philippine primetime melodrama romance television series originally aired by ABS-CBN from March 10, 1997 to April 9, 1999 (the series ended for 2 years in its long-run) replacing Maria Mercedes and was replaced by Saan Ka Man Naroroon. Claudine Barretto, Rico Yan, and Diether Ocampo played the roles of the main protagonists in the series. It was re-aired in 2008 through Studio 23 and Kapamilya Channel, which are both ABS-CBN subsidiaries. A 2011 remake, starring Lauren Young, JM de Guzman and Enrique Gil, aired on ABS-CBN from March 28, 2011, to August 12, 2011.

The show also gave critical acclaim to director Wenn V. Deramas as his first prime time soap project and as a director and gave character actress Princess Punzalan critical acclaim for her character as Selina Pereira-Matias, the main antagonist of the series. Mula sa Puso is known to be the first middle-class-themed Filipino primetime TV drama.
Its highest viewed on TV is the bus explosion scene, where Selina killed Via by bombing the bus. It can also seen on Episode 366 on Youtube.
It was also known for being the most competitive TV series in the country's TV ratings by mid-1998, alongside Esperanza, which also ran from 1997 to 1999; the popularity of the two teleseryes spawned two films both released in 1999 (Mula sa Puso in February and Esperanza in December), and a joint soundtrack entitled "Mula Sa Puso ni Esperanza". The TV series had various crossovers with prime time dramas such as Esperanza and the short-lived miniseries Sa Sandaling Kailangan Mo Ako. The show was aired from Mondays to Fridays at 6:30 pm (March 10, 1997, until January 1, 1999) and later at 8 pm (January 4, 1999, until April 9, 1999) after TV Patrol.

The story depicts on the life of Via and as she gracefully turns 18, she will discover she lives a life full of deceit. She will also discover the truth about the identities of her loved ones and the unstoppable troubles when it comes to love and life itself as she falls in love with her savior Gabriel while she also falls into a love triangle with her persistent longtime childhood friend Michael.

The series is currently streaming on Jeepney TV's YouTube Channel everyday at 3:00 pm & 3:30 pm, right after Marinella.

The bus explosion of Mula sa Puso is also iconic. When Selina (Princess Punzalan) killed Via (Claudine Barreto) by sending her henchmen in the bus where Via ride.

Plot
Via (Claudine Barretto), the only daughter of Don Fernando (Juan Rodrigo), was raised as his darling princess. On her eighteenth birthday, she found out that her father has promised her hand in marriage to her childhood friend, Michael (Diether Ocampo), and before the birthday party was over, she got kidnapped. She was rescued by a good Samaritan named Gabriel (Rico Yan), whom she fell in love with. Michael, at the latter part of the story, became romantically involved with Via's best friend, Trina (Rica Peralejo). As the story unfolds, Via ended up having to decide between the two men in her life, while learning more about her mother Magda (Jaclyn Jose) and fighting off her evil aunt Selina (Princess Punzalan).

In the story, Selina was one of the most influential characters, due to her desire to acquire the power and wealth of Don Fernando, her brother. She possesses intelligence in illegal tactics that made her stronger and she used people in order to manipulate them when a bombing in the departure of Via and her family to start a new life began. Via lived a new identity but came back to her family, and they all faced Selina one last time in dignity and Via restored peace in her family.

Cast and characters

Protagonist
 Claudine Barretto as Olivia "Via" Pereira-Maglayon / Ella Peralta

Main cast
 Rico Yan as Gabriel Maglayon
 Diether Ocampo as Michael Miranda

Supporting cast
 Princess Punzalan as Selina Pereira- Matias
 Jaclyn Jose as Magdalena "Magda" Magbanua-Pereira
 Juan Rodrigo as Don Fernando Pereira
 Rio Locsin as Corazon Bermudez- Rodrigo
 Ricky Davao as Eduard Rodrigo
 Eric Quizon as Manuel Magbanua
 Efren Reyes Jr. as Ysmael Matias
 Ariel Rivera as Raphael Buencamino
 Patrick Garcia as Warren Bermudez- Arcanghel 
 Rica Peralejo as Katrina "Trina" Alfonso-Miranda

Recurring cast
 Anne Villegas as Matilde "Tindeng" Solano
 Charito Solis as Agnes Bermudez-Delgado
 Charlie Davao as Don Ricardo Maglayon
 Lee Robin Salazar as Leo Maglayon
 Gina Alajar as Elena 
 Janice de Belen as Cornelia "Connie" Andrada 
 Maricel Laxa as Atty. Elaine Regalado
 Snooky Serna as Criselda V. Pereira
 Nida Blanca as Carmen Buencamino
 Ronaldo Valdez as Benjamin Arcanghel 
 Cherry Pie Picache as Shirley Mercado
 Gardo Versoza as Domingo
 Lailani Navarro as Winnie Bermudez 
 Shaina Magdayao as Jennifer Matias
 Jan Marini as Mariel Solano
 Eva Darren as Josefina "Pining" Miranda
 Michael "Eagle" Riggs as Roxee
 Candy Pangilinan as Berta
 Lawrence David as Lando
 Gerald Pizzaras as Neal
 Stefano Mori as Ton-ton Bermudez- Rodrigo
 Arman de Guzman as Gerry
 Ramil Rodriguez as Atty. Rogelio Miranda 
 Paula Peralejo as Joie Madrigal 
 Anna Larrucea as Nicole Pereira- Matias
 Via Veloso as Wendy
 Mark Gil as Eduardo "Bagyo" Bugayon
 Jay Manalo as Gilbert Matias
 Gino Paul Guzman as Ronald
 Erika Fife as Cindy
 Raymond Bagatsing as Nardo
 Tess Dumpit as Atty. Regalado's Doctor

Guest cast
 Judy Ann Santos as Esperanza Estrera / Socorro Bermudez-Salgado (crossover character from Esperanza)
 Luz Fernandez as Judge
 Epy Quizon as teen Manuel Magbanua
 Kaye Abad as Glenda Corpuz
 Rene Pangilinan as Michael's surgeon
 Raquel Villavicencio as Attorney
 Ricardo Cepeda as Armando "Abdon" Macasaet

Reception

Soundtrack
The series title was based on the theme song which was sung by Jude Michael composed by Vehnee Saturno as the original acoustic version on television from OctoArts Records in 1997. Roselle Nava sang the movie version in 1999. The song was re-released in 2010 as part of 60 Taon ng Musika at Soap Opera. In 2011, for the remake used a version by Jovit Baldivino. Zsa Zsa Padilla's version from 1987 is used as well often in the series.

Ratings
The series became consistent in its story plot so it was well received by the public. Its pilot episode in 1997 was 37.9%, the highest rating was 53.7% in 1998, while the average was 45.2%. Ratings are provided by AGB Nielsen Philippines.

Film
In 1999, the series was adapted into a film, alongside another hit soap Esperanza. The film versions of Mula sa Puso and Esperanza were released on February 10, 1999, with the latter film being re-released later that year as part of the 1999 Metro Manila Film Festival which premiered on December 25, 1999.

Remake

After the success of the remake of Mara Clara during the first quarter of the year, ABS-CBN announced and aired the remake of Mula Sa Puso which premiered on March 28 to August 12, 2011.

Differences between the series and the movie

 The characters of Jennifer (Shaina Magdayao) and Connie (Janice de Belen) were introduced during the early part of the series, with Jennifer being the daughter of Ysmael with Connie. The movie version excluded both Jennifer and Connie's characters.

 Criselda, Via's late stepmother, was played by Snooky Serna in the series; in the movie version, she was portrayed by Eula Valdes, who eventually became Selina in the 2011 remake.

 Ysmael (Efren Reyes Jr.), Selina's husband, was someone who always gets manipulated by her during the course of the series; in the film version, Selina and Ysmael are sidekicks who virtually treat each other as co-equals to plot against Via and Don Fernando.

 In the series, Elena (Gina Alajar) was hired by Selina and Ysmael to pose as Via's mother. The movie, however, did not include the said character.

 Nicole (Anna Larrucea) was shot and killed in both the film and the series, but the perpetrator behind her demise varied in the two versions. It was Manuel (Eric Quizon) who shot her in the series, while it was one of Selina's henchmen, Abdon (Carlos Morales), who shot her in the movie version. However, in both the film and the series, Nicole was protecting someone when she died: Jennifer in the former, and Via in the latter.

Manuel (Eric Quizon) was a serial killer in the TV version while he makes a cameo as a guest in the Wedding scene. It is likely that his movie incarnation is not a serial killer unlike the TV incarnation.

 Both the film and the TV series featured Abdon (Ricardo Cepeda in the series, Carlos Morales in the movie) getting killed by Selina after putting a time bomb in a money case. However, the reason for Abdon's murder in the series was different from what was featured in the movie; Abdon blackmailed her in the series, while Abdon killed Selina's daughter Nicole in the movie.

 In the series, Gilbert (Jay Manalo) was Gabriel's (Rico Yan) first rival for the love of Via (Claudine Barretto), while in the film, Michael (Diether Ocampo) was Gabriel's first and only rival for Via's affection.

 The series finale saw Selina (Princess Punzalan) getting hit and run by a 10 wheeler flatbed truck which led her death. In the movie, Selina died due to a car crash and eventual explosion; she was not able to get out of the car as she was punched and knocked down by Via (so that the latter could get out of the car).

See also
List of programs broadcast by ABS-CBN
List of ABS-CBN drama series
Mula sa Puso (2011 TV series)

References

External links
 
 Watch 'Mula Sa Puso' via TFCnow

1997 Philippine television series debuts
1999 Philippine television series endings
1990s Philippine television series
ABS-CBN drama series
1997 telenovelas
Television series by Dreamscape Entertainment Television
Terrorism in fiction
Espionage television series
Philippine crime television series
Philippine thriller television series
Filipino-language television shows
Television shows set in Metro Manila